The 2018–19 Missouri Valley Conference men's basketball season began with practices in October 2018, followed by the start of the 2018–19 NCAA Division I men's basketball season on November 6, 2018. Conference play began in late December 2018 and concluded in March with the Missouri Valley Conference tournament at Enterprise Center in St. Louis, Missouri.

Defending regular season and tournament champion Loyola shared the regular season title with Drake at 12-6.

Bradley defeated Northern Iowa in the championship game to win the Missouri Valley Conference tournament and thereby received the conference's automatic bid to the NCAA Tournament.

Bradley received the conference's only bid to the NCAA Tournament and lost to Michigan State in the first round, 76-65.  Loyola-Chicago received a bid to the NIT and lost in the first round at Creighton, 70-61.

Drake was the only other conference school that received a bid to a postseason tournament, receiving a bid to the CollegeInsider.com Tournament where they lost in the first round at Southern Utah, 80-73.

Head coaches

Coaching changes 
On March 3, 2018, Missouri State announced that head coach Paul Lusk had been fired. He finished with a seven-year record of 106–121. The school announced that former Tennessee State head coach Dana Ford had been named head coach of the Bears on March 21.

On March 13, 2018, Evansville fired head coach Marty Simmons. He finished at Evansville with an 11-year record of 184–175. On March 22, the school hired Boston Celtics assistant coach, former Kentucky player and Evansville native Walter McCarty as head coach.

On March 22, 2018, Drake announced that head coach Niko Medved had accepted the head coaching position at Colorado State, where he had previously served as an assistant. A week after Medved's departure, Drake hired Creighton assistant and Iowa native Darian DeVries for the head coaching job.

Coaches

Notes: 
 All records, appearances, titles, etc. are from time with current school only. 
 Overall and MVC records are from time at current school and are through the beginning of the season.
 Ford, Lottich, and Moser's conference records only includes MVC play, not other conference records.

Preseason

Preseason poll 
Source

Preseason All-MVC teams

Source

Regular season

Conference matrix
This table summarizes the head-to-head results between teams in conference play. Each team will play 18 conference games, playing each team twice.

Postseason

Missouri Valley Conference tournament

References

 
Missouri Valley Conference men's basketball tournament